Luka Pejović (born 27 July 1994) is a Croatian footballer who plays as a midfielder.

Club career

FO ŽP Šport Podbrezová
Pejović made his only Fortuna Liga for ŽP Šport Podbrezová on 5 March 2017 against MŠK Žilina, coming on as a substitute for Filip Lepieš in the second half.

He played 7 games for USKOK Klis in 2020.

References

External links
 
Fortuna Liga profile
Futbalnet profile

1994 births
Living people
Sportspeople from Dubrovnik
Association football midfielders
Croatian footballers
NK Lučko players
FK Železiarne Podbrezová players
MFK Lokomotíva Zvolen players
NK Uskok players
NK Krško players
Slovak Super Liga players
2. Liga (Slovakia) players
Slovenian Second League players
Croatian expatriate footballers
Expatriate footballers in Slovakia
Croatian expatriate sportspeople in Slovakia
Expatriate footballers in Germany
Croatian expatriate sportspeople in Germany
Expatriate footballers in Slovenia
Croatian expatriate sportspeople in Slovenia